is an electronic music artist from Tokyo, Japan.  He grew up in the suburbs of Fujisawa. He released his first full-length album, Minima Moralia on Kranky in 2006.  He is the owner of the record label White Paddy Mountain which he launched in 2010.

Hatakeyama's music is characteristically very slow, composed by repeatedly processing guitars, pianos, and vibraphones on a laptop.  The result is a mix of droning chords and sparse single instruments rising above the mix.  His music may be classified as either ambient music, experimental music or new-age music. Chihei Hatakeyama has released over 70 albums as of 2020.

Discography
 Minima Moralia (2006), Kranky
 Dedication (2008), Magic Book
 Saunter (2009), Under the Spire
 August (2009), Room40
 The River (2009), Hibernate
 The Secret Distance of Tochka (2009), Boid
 White Sun (2009), taâlem
 Live at Nagoya (2009)
 A Long Journey (2010), Home Normal
 Ghostly Garden (2010), Own
 Variations (2010), Soundscaping
 Void (2010), White Paddy Mountain
 Mirror (2011), Room40
 Air (2011), Whereabouts – with naph
 White Night (2011), White Paddy Mountain
 Red (2011), White Paddy Mountain
 Void II (2012), White Paddy Mountain
 Norma (2012), Small Fragments
 Scale Compositions (2012), Home Normal – with Asuna
 Void III (2013), White Paddy Mountain
 Bare Strata (2013), Whereabouts
 The Bull Head Emperor (2013), Rural Colours
 Alone by the Sea (2013), White Paddy Mountain
 Void IV (2013), White Paddy Mountain
 Midnight in Hsinking (2013), duenn
 Sacrifice for Pleasure (2013), Airplane
 Void V (2014), White Paddy Mountain
 Void VI (2014), White Paddy Mountain
 It Is, It Isn't (2014) – Chihei Hatakeyama & Hakobune
 Winter Storm (2014)
 Too Much Sadness (2014)
 Falling Sun (2014), Rural Colours – with Good Weather for an Airstrike
 Live at Ftarri Doubtmusic Festival (2014), Meenna – with Kiyoshi Mizutani and Hello
 Mist (2015), White Paddy Mountain
 Frozen Silence (2015), White Paddy Mountain – with Sakana Hosomi
 Moon Light Reflecting Over Mountains (2015), Room40
 Void VII (2015), White Paddy Mountain
 Magical Imaginary Child (2015), White Paddy Mountain – with Federico Durand
 Five Dreams (2015), White Paddy Mountain
 Void VIII (2015), White Paddy Mountain
 Moss (2015), White Paddy Mountain – with Ken Ikeda
 The Storm of Silence (2016), Glacial Movements – with Dirk Serries
 Void IX (2016), White Paddy Mountain
 You're Still in It (2016), Constellation Tatsu
 Requiem for Black Night and Earth Spiders (2016), White Paddy Mountain
 Euphotic (2016), White Paddy Mountain – with Corey Fuller
 Grace (2016), White Paddy Mountain
 The Fall Rises (2016), White Paddy Mountain – with Hakobune
 Coastal Railroads in Memories (2016), White Paddy Mountain
 Above the Desert (2016), Dronarivm
 Sora (2017), White Paddy Mountain – with Federico Durand
 Void X (2017), White Paddy Mountain
 Void XI (2017), White Paddy Mountain
 Void XII (2017), White Paddy Mountain
 Mirage (2017), Room40
 Void XIII (2017), White Paddy Mountain
 Lunar Eclipse (2017), White Paddy Mountain – with Tamaru
 Void XIV (2017), White Paddy Mountain
 Maybe (2017), White Paddy Mountain
 Heavy Snow (2017), White Paddy Mountain
 Far From the Atmosphere (2017), Hiss Noise
 Void XV (2018), White Paddy Mountain
 Solitary Universe (2018), Aagoo – with Eraldo Bernocchi
 Void XVI (2018), White Paddy Mountain
 Journey to the End of August (2018), Hidden Vibes
 Scene (2018), Constellation Tatsu
 Butterfly's Summer and Vanished (2018), White Paddy Mountain
 FTS002 (2018), First Terrace – with Vida Vojić
 Afterimage (2018), White Paddy Mountain
 Void XVII (2018), White Paddy Mountain
 Live at St Giles (2018), First Terrace – with Specimens
 Erroribus humanis et antinomy, OTOOTO (2019) – with Tetuzi Akiyama and Ken Ikeda
 Void XVIII (2019), White Paddy Mountain
 Jodo (2019), White Paddy Mountain – with Stijn Hüwels
 Void XIX (2019), White Paddy Mountain
 Ghost Woods (2019), White Paddy Mountain
 Forgotten Hill (2019), Room40
 Illusion Harbor (2020), Subcontinental
 Crescent Moon (2020), EndTitles
 Void XX (2020), White Paddy Mountain
 Blue Goat (2020), Longform Editions
 Studio Improvisation in June 12th (2020), Ochiai Soup
 Late Spring (2021), Gearbox Records

References

External links
 
 
 

1978 births
Japanese electronic musicians
Living people
Musicians from Kanagawa Prefecture
People from Kanagawa Prefecture